Nicholas (died after 1300) was a Hungarian prelate in the 13th century, who served as Bishop of Syrmia from around 1299 to 1300.

Career
Nicholas first appeared as Bishop of Syrmia in July 1299. Upon the request of the Cistercian monks of Bélakút Abbey (near present-day Petrovaradin, Serbia), Nicholas transcribed and confirmed their privileges on 31 January 1300, formerly granted by Archbishop Lodomer in 1286. He was last mentioned as bishop by a charter of Michael Bő, Bishop of Zagreb on 6 March 1300. His seal was preserved by the aforementioned document, issued in July 1299.

References

Sources 

 
 

13th-century Hungarian people
13th-century Roman Catholic bishops in Hungary
Roman Catholic Bishops of Syrmia